The spt function (smallest parts function) is a function in number theory that counts the sum of the number of smallest parts in each partition of a positive integer. It is related to the partition function.

The first few values of spt(n) are:

1, 3, 5, 10, 14, 26, 35, 57, 80, 119, 161, 238, 315, 440, 589 ...

Example 

For example, there are five partitions of 4 (with smallest parts underlined):

3 + 
 + 
2 +  + 
 +  +  + 

These partitions have 1, 1, 2, 2, and 4 smallest parts, respectively. So spt(4) = 1 + 1 + 2 + 2 + 4 = 10.

Properties 

Like the partition function, spt(n) has a generating function. It is given by

where .

The function  is related to a mock modular form. Let  denote the weight 2 quasi-modular Eisenstein series and let  denote the Dedekind eta function.

While a closed formula is not known for spt(n), there are Ramanujan-like congruences including

References

Combinatorics
Integer sequences